East Newark, New Jersey was incorporated on July 3, 1895. It is governed under the borough form of New Jersey municipal government. The governing body consists of a Mayor and a Borough Council comprising six council members, with all positions elected at-large on a partisan basis as part of the November general election. A Mayor is elected directly by the voters to a four-year term of office. The Borough Council consists of six members elected to serve three-year terms on a staggered basis, with two seats coming up for election each year in a three-year cycle. The Borough form of government used by East Newark, the most common system used in the state, is a "weak mayor / strong council" government in which council members act as the legislative body with the mayor presiding at meetings and voting only in the event of a tie. The mayor can veto ordinances subject to an override by a two-thirds majority vote of the council. The mayor makes committee and liaison assignments for council members, and most appointments are made by the mayor with the advice and consent of the council.

Mayors
The individuals who have served as the borough's mayor are: Terms began January 1 and end December 31.

References

East Newark
East Newark, New Jersey